Chorlton Hall is a country house in the parish of Chorlton, Cheshire, England. The house dates from the 17th century, with additions made in the second quarter of the 19th century. Its entrance front is pebbledashed and it stands on a stone plinth. The roof is slated. The house is in 2½ storeys plus cellars. Across the front are three bays, each with a gable, and with the central bay protruding. On the gables are ball finials. The porch has an ogee-arched entrance. The house is recorded in the National Heritage List for England as a designated Grade II listed building. A stable block and two cottages to the southeast of the house have also been designated at Grade II.

See also

Listed buildings in Chorlton, Cheshire West and Chester

References

Houses completed in the 17th century
Houses completed in the 19th century
Country houses in Cheshire
Grade II listed buildings in Cheshire
Grade II listed houses